HTRK (formerly Hate Rock Trio) is an Australian band formed in 2003. The band is currently a duo of vocalist Jonnine Standish and guitarist Nigel Yang; bassist Sean Stewart was a member until his death in 2010. 

The band's debut album was produced by Rowland S. Howard. Pitchfork noted how since Stewart's death, the band "shed the cold, industrial leanings of their earlier releases for a more overtly sensual approach, something that could soundtrack moments of intimacy or ennui, or both."

Biography

Emergence

Originating from Melbourne, and previously based in Berlin and London, HTRK (pronounced Hate Rock) started playing in November 2003 when guitarist Nigel Yang and bassist Sean Stewart invited vocalist Jonnine Standish to create music inspired by the surrealistic films of David Lynch, along with protopunk and post-industrial ideas. Using a very slow 808 drum machine, minimal bass grooves and highly textured noise, their attitude clashed with the "rock and roll" status quo in Australia. HTRK's first release was the Nostalgia EP in 2004, originally intended as a demo but later self-released in a limited 500-disc run.

Their live shows soon caught the attention of underground icon Rowland S. Howard and popular Australian producer Lindsay Gravina, who invited them to record their debut album at Gravina's Birdland Studios. Titled Marry Me Tonight and considered something of a pop effort by the band, the album was held in limbo for several years due to a protracted rights dispute. In August 2005, the band performed as a support act for Howard at the premiere party for Scott Crary's film, Kill Your Idols, in Melbourne.

Breakthrough

In 2006, a few months after recording Marry Me Tonight, the trio relocated to Berlin, toured with fellow expatriates Devastations and played their first UK gig at the 20jazzfunkgreats club in Brighton. Upon witnessing a show at the Brixton Windmill, UK label Fire Records signed HTRK to give Nostalgia a wider international release. A 27-date European tour supporting Liars and a performance at Glasgow's Optimo followed in 2007.

In 2008, they began to be managed by Paul Smith, who organised London shows with Lydia Lunch and Alan Vega. Stewart and Standish spent part of the year in Melbourne recording as guests on Howard's final album, Pop Crimes, including a duet by Howard and Standish, "(I Know) a Girl Called Jonny".

Marry Me Tonight was finally released in 2009 on Smith's independent label Blast First Petite, receiving critical favor from the UK press, scoring 8 out of 10 in NME, making Artrockers best of 2009 list and an office ambience listing in The Wire. Artist and former porn actress Sasha Grey also listed Marry Me Tonight in her top three albums in a Stereogum end-of-year poll.

That year, HTRK were invited by Yeah Yeah Yeahs, the Horrors and Fuck Buttons to embark on various European tours. Their increased profile led to a headline show at Cargo in London in January 2010, which coincided with the release of the first of a series of free mixtapes and appearances in US magazines Alternative Press and Nylon.

Re-organisation

Tragedy struck on 18 March 2010, when Stewart was found dead in his London home from suicide. Speculation on the Australian music website Mess+Noise was later confirmed in a statement sent to the media. NME published an obituary on 24 April 2010 with tributes from Yeah Yeah Yeahs' Nick Zinner and the Horrors' Faris Badwan.

Standish and Yang have remained active, beginning with a comeback show at the ICA in London on 29 November 2010. They have since released four further albums on Ghostly International, Work (Work, Work) on 12 September 2011, Psychic 9–5 Club on 1 April 2014 (co-produced by Nathan Corbin), Venus in Leo, September 2019, Rhinestones in September 2021, and Death is a Dream in April 2022. 

At the Music Victoria Awards of 2014, Psychic 9–5 Club was nominated for best album.

Since 2016, Standish has been based in the Dandenong Ranges, east of Melbourne, where the band also has a studio.

Venus in Leo contains a cover of Missy Elliott's 1998 single "Hit Em wit da Hee". The band's fifth album Rhinestones was released in September 2021. It was their first to chart in Australia (at number 58). Pitchfork compared the album to a "subterranean Everything But the Girl" and observed that they traded "their minimal-wave roots for unexpected forays into gothic country."

Collaborations

The band has collaborated with New York-based film maker Nathan Corbin, (Bendin', Chinatown Style, Venus in Leo) and costume designer and wardrobe stylist Jenni Hensler, who has done styling for Standish and who also worked on the 2014 video for the song "Chinatown Style."

Members
Jonnine Standish – vocals, percussion, samples
Nigel Yang – guitar, programming, electronics

Former members
Sean Stewart – bass guitar, programming (2003–2010; his death)

Discography

Studio albums

Compilations

EPs

Awards and nominations

Music Victoria Awards
The Music Victoria Awards are an annual awards night celebrating Victorian music. They commenced in 2006.

! 
|-
| Music Victoria Awards of 2014
| ''Psychic 9-5 Club'
| Best Album
| 
| 
|-

References

External links
yourcomicbookfantasy.com Official site
htrk.tumblr.com Official blog

Interviews
Interview with Nigel Yang at betaarti, 16 January 2011

Australian indie rock groups
Blast First artists
Musical groups from Melbourne